The Hasle Formation is a geologic formation on the island on Bornholm, Denmark. It is of early to late Pliensbachian age. Vertebrate fossils have been uncovered from this formation. The type section of the formation is found at the south of the costal Hasle Town, and it is composed by rusty yellow to brownish siltstones and very fine-grained sandstones. The southernmost arch, Hvjdoddebuen, is not as fossil-bearing as the type unit in Hasle. The formation can be separated in two different petrographic types: type 1 sandstones are friable with layers and lenses of concretionary siderite and type 2 well-cemented sandstones. Both types where deposited in a relatively high-energy marine environment with a diagenetic pattern that demonstrates a close relation to various phases of  subsidence and uplift in the tectonically unstable Fennoscandian Border Zone.
Most of its deposition happened on a storm-dominated shoreface, with the exposed parts deposited in an open marine shelf within 1–2 km distance from the fault-controlled coastlines. However, recent works have recovered terrestrial fauna from it, including a footprint, suggesting easterly winds and low tide could have exposed the inner parts of the upper shoreface, and create long-lasting Floodplain-type environments. Field works since 1984 have shown a mostly hummocky cross-stratified deposition, with great complexity of the sediments that suggests very complicated and variable flow conditions, with Megaripples derived from storm events. Storms were frequent and the coastline faced a wide epeiric sea with a fetch towards the west of possibly 1000 kilometers. The Jamesoni–Ibex Chronozone in the Central European Basin represents a clear sea Transgression, due to the appearance of ammonites from Thuringia and southern Lower Saxony, showing a full marine ingression towards the west. This rise in the sea level is also measured in the north, as is proven by the presence of Uptonia jamesoni in Kurremölla (Röddinge Formation, Skåne) and Beaniceras centaurus plus
Phricodoceras taylori on the Hasle Formation. The whole Hasle Sandstones are a result of this rise in the sea level, where the marine sediments cover the deltaic layers of the Rønne Formation. The rise in the sea level is observed on palynology, as on the Hasle Formation Nannoceratopsis senex (Dinoflajellate) and Mendicodinium reticulaturn (Algae Acritarch) appear, indicating a transition from paralic and restricted marine to fully marine.

Fossil content

Annelida

Brachiopoda

Bivalvia

Scaphopoda

Gastropoda

Belemnites

Ammonites

Chondrichthyes 
Unidentified fin spines are known from this formation.

Actinopteri

Sauropterygia

Thalattosuchia

Pterosauria

Theropods

Sauropodomorpha

Synapsida

See also 
 List of fossiliferous stratigraphic units in Denmark
 Neringa Formation, Lithuania
 Pliensbachian formations
 Mizur Formation, North Caucasus
 Blanowice Formation, Southern Poland
 Clarens Formation, South Africa
 Fernie Formation, Canada
 Kota Formation, India
 Los Molles Formation, Argentina
 Mawson Formation, Antarctica
 Rotzo Formation, Italy
 Whiteaves Formation, British Columbia
 Navajo Sandstone, Utah
 Kandreho Formation, Madagascar
 Kota Formation, India
 Cattamarra Coal Measures, Australia

References 

 
Geologic formations of Denmark
Jurassic System of Europe
Jurassic Denmark
Sandstone formations
Shallow marine deposits
Paleontology in Denmark
Formations